Our Lady of the Assumption Co-Cathedral or simply Opava Cathedral for a short, are both common names of the monumental gothic church in the very center of the city of Opava in the Czech Republic. 

Its construction is believed to start during the reign of the Czech King Ottokar I (in Czech Přemysl Otakar I., 1198–1230). Cathedral is built of red bricks, has three naves and two towers. It is built in the fourteenth century Gothic style. Its southern tower is 102 meters tall (a few meters taller than Prague Castle Tower) and remains to be the tallest church tower in Silesia. 

Establishing the Church of the Assumption in Opava is associated with the Teutonic Knights. The construction of the church probably began shortly after 1204. Details about earlier Romanesque church at this place are not well known. But the letter from King Wenceslas I of 12 May 1237 already mentions the rectory in Opava. Construction of the church stopped after the death of Premysl Otakar II. It has resumed again after the return of his illegitimate son Nicholas I. Over the time, church undergone some additional baroque and neogothic remakes, suffered from fires in 1689 and 1759 and survived the heavy shelling from Red Army during the second world war. Until today, the church remains to be one of the largest buildings in Opava and one of spectacular dominants of the city. In 1995 the building was declared a national monument of the Czech Republic. Since year 1996, it is the second seat of the bishop of Ostrava-Opava (hence "Co-cathedral"). It serves as a catholic church until this very day.

See also
Roman Catholicism in the Czech Republic
Our Lady of the Assumption

References

Roman Catholic cathedrals in the Czech Republic
Buildings and structures in Opava